Samransak Kram (born 10 November 1983, Alor Star, Kedah) is a Thai-Malaysian footballer currently playing as a striker for Perlis FA and a former Malaysia national team. He is the brother of Manopsak Kram.

Career
Born as a Siamese native, nicknamed 'Sam', Samransak started his football career with Sultan Abdul Hamid College schoolboy and promoted to the Kedah FA President Cup before Mohd Azraai Khor Abdullah brought him into the senior squad starting from 2005.

Samransak made his international debut against Indonesia in 2006 Merdeka Tournament. He also played in 2006 Asian Games with Malaysia under-23. In 2007, Samransak made his first appearances in ASEAN Football Championship. However, Malaysia only manage to reach the semifinal losing to Singapore on penalty shoot-out.

In 2007 Merdeka Tournament, Samransak help Malaysia to win the cup after defeating Myanmar 3–1. He also take part in 2007 SEA Games and 2008 Olympic games qualification.

External links
 

1985 births
Living people
Malaysian footballers
Malaysia international footballers
Kedah Darul Aman F.C. players
Malaysian people of Thai descent
People from Kedah
Footballers at the 2006 Asian Games
Association football forwards
Asian Games competitors for Malaysia